Tobias Kamke and Philipp Marx were the defending champions, but chose not to defend their title. Unseeded pair Andrea Arnaboldi and Antonio Šančić won the title defeating Wesley Koolhof and Matwé Middelkoop in the final 6–4, 2–6, [14–12].

Seeds

Draw

References
 Main Draw

Open de Rennes - Doubles
2015 Doubles